Winesburg may refer to:

 Winesburg, Ohio, a 1919 book by Sherwood Anderson
 Winesburg, Holmes County, Ohio, an unincorporated community
 Winesburg College, the fictional setting for Philip Roth's 2008 novel Indignation

See also
 Weinsberg, a town in Germany